Planaltinella rhatyma is a species of moth of the family Tortricidae. It is found in Brazil in the Federal District and the state of Goiás.

References

Moths described in 1994
Cochylini